The seniors' division of the UAAP Season 74 volleyball tournaments opened November 26, 2011. Tournaments are hosted by Ateneo de Manila University. Tournament games are held at the Filoil Flying V Arena in San Juan City.

Usually held in the first semester, the UAAP Board decided to move the juniors' division tournaments on the second semester of the  school year. In boys' tournament, the NU Bullpups and UST Tiger Cubs, which are tied at second place, played for the #2 seed with the latter winning the playoff. UE Junior Spikers successfully defended their title after beating UST in the finals. UE was awarded their tenth and eighth consecutive UAAP boys' volleyball championship. On the other hand, the La Salle Junior Lady Archers won all of their elimination round games in girls' division to clinch the championship outright.

In men's tournament, the FEU Tamaraws and the defending champions UST Tiger Spikers emerged on top of the standings and faced La Salle Green Spikers and Adamson Falcons in semifinals respectively. UST beat Adamson in four sets in semifinals to formalize their entry to the Finals. La Salle forced a rubber match but FEU won in a thrilling four-set battle on the second game to face third consecutive Finals rematch with UST.

In women's tournament, the La Salle Lady Spikers had the distinction of sweeping the double round eliminations 14–0, capped by a win against Ateneo Lady Spikers (3–2) on their last elimination round game. The UST Tigresses snagged the solo third spot into the Final Four after beating Adamson Lady Falcons in straight sets on their last game of eliminations. With La Salle sweeping the elimination round, the playoff tournament went through the stepladder format. Being tied at fourth place, FEU Lady Tamaraws blanked Adamson on a play for the #4 seed, the last berth to the first round of the playoffs. UST defeated FEU in a playoff, but Ateneo, enjoying twice-to-beat advantage, marched to their first UAAP Finals appearance with a win over the Tigresses.

Men's tournament

Elimination round

Team standings

Schedule

Results 
Results to the right and top of the black cells are first round games, those to the left and below are second round games.

Bracket

Semifinals

FEU vs. La Salle 
Elimination round games:
 November 26: FEU (3–1) La Salle at the Filoil Flying V Arena (25–16, 17–25, 25–23, 25–16)
 February 1: FEU (3–2) La Salle at the Filoil Flying V Arena (20–25, 25–20, 20–25, 25–19, 15–11)

UST vs. Adamson 
Elimination round games:
 December 7: UST (3–2) Adamson at the Filoil Flying V Arena (25–21, 20–25, 22–25, 25–21, 15–9)
 January 21: UST (0–3) Adamson at the Filoil Flying V Arena (18–25, 23–25, 20–25)

Finals 
Elimination round games:
 January 8: FEU (2–3) UST at the Filoil Flying V Arena (25–14, 26–24, 21–25, 21–25, 11–15)
 January 14: FEU (3–1) UST at the Filoil Flying V Arena (25–19, 23–25, 25–22, 25–17)

Awards 

The UAAP awarded the outstanding players of the season prior to Game 1 of the Finals of men's volleyball at Filoil Flying V Arena in San Juan.
 Most Valuable Player (Season): Jayson Ramos, University of Santo Tomas
 Most Valuable Player (Finals): Rodolfo Labrador, Jr., Far Eastern University
 Best Scorer: Rodolfo Labrador, Jr., Far Eastern University
 Best Attacker: Peter Den Mar Torres, National University
 Best Blocker: Ruben Inaudito, National University
 Best Setter: Pitrus Paolo de Ocampo, Far Eastern University
 Best Server: John Hendrix Competente, Adamson University
 Best Receiver: Paul Jan Doloiras, University of Santo Tomas
 Best Digger: Gilbert Longavela, Adamson University

Women's tournament

Elimination round 
With La Salle's 14–0 sweep of the tournament, they were supposed to proceed to the usual Final Four playoffs but instead will go through the stepladder format after UAAP Board upheld La Salle's appeal.

Team standings

Schedule

Results 
Results to the right and top of the black cells are first round games, those to the left and below are second round games.

Bracket

Fourth–seed playoff 
Adamson and FEU, which are tied at fourth place, played for the #4 seed, the last berth to the first round of the playoffs.

Elimination round games:
 December 17: Adamson (0–3) FEU at the Filoil Flying V Arena (22–25, 23–25, 17–25)
 February 1: Adamson (3–1) FEU at the Filoil Flying V Arena (25–18, 25–18, 21–25, 25–19)

First round 
Elimination round games:
 December 7: UST (3–2) FEU at the Filoil Flying V Arena (25–19, 21–25, 22–25, 25–16, 15–13)
 January 22: UST (1–3) FEU at the Filoil Flying V Arena (25–23, 20–25, 23–25, 23–25)

Semifinal 
Elimination round games:
 November 27: Ateneo (3–0) UST at the Filoil Flying V Arena (25–16, 25–23, 25–18)
 January 15: Ateneo (1–3) UST at the Filoil Flying V Arena (25–14, 21–25, 19–25, 23–25)

Finals 
Elimination round games:
 December 3: La Salle (3–1) Ateneo at the Filoil Flying V Arena (21–25, 25–22, 25–18, 25–21)
 February 12: La Salle (3–2) Ateneo at the Filoil Flying V Arena (18–25, 25–14, 21–25, 25–19, 15–7)
La Salle has the thrice-to-beat advantage after sweeping the elimination round.

Awards 

The UAAP awarded the outstanding players of the season prior to Game 2 of the Finals of women's volleyball at Filoil Flying V Arena in San Juan.
 Most Valuable Player (Season): Abigail Maraño, De La Salle University
 Most Valuable Player (Finals): Charleen Abigail Cruz, De La Salle University
 Rookie of the Year: Victonara Galang, De La Salle University
 Best Scorer: Rosemarie Vargas, Far Eastern University
 Best Attacker: Maika Angela Ortiz, University of Santo Tomas
 Best Blocker: Michele Gumabao, De La Salle University
 Best Setter: Gyzelle Sy, Far Eastern University
 Best Server: Victonara Galang, De La Salle University
 Best Receiver: Angelica Vasquez, Adamson University
 Best Digger: Christine Agno, Far Eastern University

Boys' tournament

Elimination round

Team standings

Bracket

Awards 

Most Valuable Player: Edward Camposano, University of the East
Rookie of the Year: Christian Gopio, University of the East
Best Attacker: Edward Camposano, University of the East
Best Receiver: Karl Roque, University of the East
Best Blocker: Edward Camposano, University of the East
Best Server: Wesley Fabroa, University of Santo Tomas
Best Setter: Geuel Asia, University of the East
Best Libero: Manuel Sumanguid III, National University

Girls' tournament 
With De La Salle sweeping the elimination round, they were declared automatic champions and the playoffs were scrapped.

Elimination round

Team standings

Awards 

Most Valuable Player: Julienne Calugcug, De La Salle University
Rookie of the Year: Christine Mhae Tolentino, University of the East
Best Attacker: 
Best Blocker: Kim Kianna Dy, De La Salle University
Best Server: Ennajie Laure, University of Santo Tomas
Best Receiver: 
Best Setter: Nina Baltazar, University of the East
Best Libero: Dawn Nicole Macandili, De La Salle University

References 

2012 in Philippine sport
2011 in volleyball
2012 in volleyball
UAAP Season 74
UAAP volleyball tournaments